The avocado is a tree, and also its fruit which is often used for culinary purposes.

Avocado may also refer to:

 Pearl Jam (album), a music album by the band Pearl Jam, sometimes known as Avocado
 Avocado (color)
 Project Avocado, affording additional military powers to the United States president